Jorge Ottati may refer to:

 Jorge Ottati (Senior), sports announcer
 Jorge Ottati (Junior), his son, sports announcer